The 1974 Virginia Slims of Philadelphia  was a women's tennis tournament played on indoor carpet courts at the Palestra in Philadelphia, Pennsylvania in the United States that was part of the 1974 Virginia Slims World Championship Series. It was the third edition of the tournament and was held from April 22 through April 28, 1974. Seventh-seeded Olga Morozova won the singles title and earned $10,000 first-prize money.

Finals

Singles
 Olga Morozova defeated   Billie Jean King 7–6(5–2), 6–1

Doubles
 Rosemary Casals /  Billie Jean King defeated  Kerry Harris /  Lesley Hunt 6–3, 7–6

Prize money

Notes

References

Virginia Slims of Philadelphia
Advanta Championships of Philadelphia
Virginia Slims of Philadelphia
Virginia Slims of Philadelphia
Virginia Slims of Philadelphia